St. Vladimir's Cathedral is an Orthodox church in Sevastopol which was built in the aftermath of the Crimean War as a memorial to the heroes of the Siege of Sevastopol (1854–1855).

History 
It was the admiral Mikhail Lazarev who came up with the idea to build St. Vladimir's Cathedral in Sevastopol rather than in Chersonesus as was originally intended. The church contains the tombs of Lazarev and three of his disciples – Vladimir Kornilov, Vladimir Istomin and Pavel Nakhimov – who died during the siege.

The architecture of the church is Neo-Byzantine. The original design was submitted by Konstantin Thon for the Chersonesus Cathedral. It was reworked by a local architect, Aleksey Avdeyev. The lower church was consecrated in 1881, the upper church was finished 7 years later.

The building rises to a height of 32.5 meters. The marble-clad interior was decorated by a team of Swiss and Italian artists. The names of the heroes of the 1850s siege are inscribed on the walls. The tombs of the admirals were destroyed by the Soviets in 1931. The church sustained further damage in the Second World War.

Archbishop Joachim (Levitsky) was supposedly martyred by Bolsheviks inside St Vladimir's Cathedral in April 1920 (or perhaps as late as 1921) by being crucified upside-down on the royal doors of the iconostasis. The cathedral's archpriest, Aleksei Nazarevsky, was also allegedly murdered along with him, although the details of when either man died, yet alone how, are not clear.  Sevastopol was under the occupation of the White Russian forces of Wrangel until November 1920, and the last definite information about Levitsky is his departure for the city in 1918.

Gallery

See also 

 Brotherhood Cemetery
 Chersonesus Cathedral
 Neo-Byzantine architecture in the Russian Empire

References

External links 
  
 Saint Vladimir Cathedral at Find a Grave

Byzantine Revival architecture in Ukraine
Churches in Crimea
Eastern Orthodox cathedrals in Ukraine
19th-century Eastern Orthodox church buildings
Military monuments and memorials
Church buildings with domes
Crimean War
Buildings and structures in Sevastopol
Tourist attractions in Crimea
Cultural heritage monuments in Sevastopol